Peter Valla (born 20 March 1990 in Skalica) is a Slovak football defender who currently plays for PFK Piešťany, on loan from the Slovak Corgoň Liga club FK AS Trenčín.

Career statistics

External links
AS Trenčín profile 

1990 births
Living people
Slovak footballers
Association football defenders
FK Senica players
AS Trenčín players
PFK Piešťany players
Slovak Super Liga players
Sportspeople from Skalica